Mark Sutcliffe (born 1968) is a former journalist and the 59th mayor of Ottawa. 

Mark Sutcliffe may also refer to:
Mark Sutcliffe, singer and guitarist in the English band Trespass
Mark Sutcliffe, goalkeeper for the New Zealand Rangers A.F.C.
Mark Sutcliffe, CEO of Hong Kong Football Association